Pandemis stipulaceana is a species of moth of the  family Tortricidae. It is found in Madagascar.

Subspecies
Pandemis stipulaceana stipulaceana
Pandemis stipulaceana hoplophora (Diakonoff, 1960)

References

	

Moths described in 1900
Pandemis